Jonathan Langa (born November 15, 1990) is a Canadian football defensive back who is currently a free agent. He was drafted by the Tiger-Cats in the 3rd round, 20th overall, in the 2015 CFL Draft. He played CIS football for the Saint Mary's Huskies.

College
Saint Mary's University (SMU) 2012-14

College achievements
155 Total Tackles
2 Quarterback Sacks
2 Forced Fumbles
2 Fumble Recoveries
3 Time AUS All-Star
CIS Defensive Player of the Year (2014)

Single season record with 80 tackles in 8 games, set a school record of 13 tackles in a game vs St. Francis Xavier University.

Professional career
Langa was drafted by the Hamilton Tiger-Cats in the third round of the 2015 CFL Draft. He dressed in 16 games in the 2015 season.

References

External links 
Hamilton Tiger-Cats bio 
CFL Player BIO
Jay Langa recovers kickoff

1990 births
Canadian football defensive backs
Hamilton Tiger-Cats players
Living people
Players of Canadian football from Ontario
Sportspeople from Etobicoke
Canadian football people from Toronto